A87 or A-87 may refer to:
 A87 autoroute, a motorway in western France
 A87 road, a road in Highland, Scotland
 Dutch Defence, in the Encyclopaedia of Chess Openings, first cited in 1789
 Stuart Highway, a South Australian highway signed as A87, established 1860
 Brussels South Charleroi Airport, Advanced Landing Ground A87 during World War II
 Aéropostale (clothing), a clothing company founded in 1987